Kiran Srinivas (born March 25, 1985) is an Indian television and film actor. He received critical acclaim for the role of a drug addict, "Roy D'Souza" in Channel V India's Paanch 5 Wrongs Make A Right and played "Dev" in Colors's 24. He was also seen portraying "Dr. Ishaan Srinivas" in Bindass's show Zindagi Wins. He had also acted in Gumrah on Channel V India, Pyaar Tune Kya Kiya on Zing TV and Yeh Hai Aashiqui on Bindass.

Personal life 
Srinivas was born and raised in Bangalore, in the state of Karnataka, India. He married Hitha Chandrashekar on 2 December 2019.

Filmography

Television

Films

Web series

References

21st-century Indian male actors
Indian male film actors
Indian male television actors
Male actors in Hindi cinema
Living people
Male actors from Bangalore
Kannada people
1985 births